Merchant factor may refer to:
 Factor (agent), a mercantile agent who receives and sells goods on commission
 Factoring (finance), a financial transaction whereby a business sells its invoices to a third party at a discount
 Merchant cash advance, a payment to a business in exchange for a percentage of future credit card and/or debit card sales